Igor Vladimirovich Ryzhkov (born 15 April 1988) is a Russian professional football player.

Club career
He made his Russian Football National League debut for FC Lada-Tolyatti on 17 August 2006 in a game against FC Ural Yekaterinburg.

External links
 
 

1988 births
Sportspeople from Tolyatti
Living people
Russian footballers
Association football midfielders
FC Lada-Tolyatti players
FC KAMAZ Naberezhnye Chelny players
FC Khimik Dzerzhinsk players
FC Akron Tolyatti players